Tuomas Santavuori (born January 24, 1985) is a Finnish former professional ice hockey forward.

Santavuori played in the SM-liiga for Pelicans, Ässät and HPK.

References

External links

1985 births
Living people
Ässät players
Finnish ice hockey forwards
Guildford Flames players
HPK players
EHC Klostersee players
Kulager Petropavl players
Lahti Pelicans players
Peliitat Heinola players
People from Savonlinna
Rungsted Seier Capital players
Scorpions de Mulhouse players
Sportspeople from South Savo